Carnivores: Ice Age is a first-person shooter video game developed by Action Forms and published by WizardWorks for Microsoft Windows. It is the third game in the Carnivores series. Unlike the previous games, in which the player must hunt dinosaurs, Carnivores: Ice Age allows the player to stalk large Cenozoic animals such as mammoths and saber-toothed cats. In 2011, the game was ported to iOS and Android devices by Tatem Games, and to PlayStation Portable by WizardWorks.

Storyline 
The game's story follows the events of its predecessors, in which an Earth corporation purchased the rights to a dinosaur-inhabited planet codenamed FMM UV-32 and created the DinoHunt Corporation, allowing customers to hunt the planet's dinosaurs. Scientists also found Ice Age animals living in the Arctic regions of FMM UV-32 and they set up a separate hunting program for big game living there.

Gameplay 
Carnivores: Ice Age is a first-person shooter in which the player can hunt 10 animals, including Diatryma, Megaloceros, Smilodon, and the woolly rhinoceros. Weapons include a handgun, rifles, shotguns, and a crossbow. Accessories such as camouflage, cover scents, and radar can be used during hunts, but their usage decreases the player's ultimate score. The game features five levels, each with diverse landscapes and creatures.

Ports 
Carnivores: Ice Age was ported to mobile devices, first appearing for iOS in the United States on February 8, 2011. The game was later ported to Android, and the iOS/Android version was later released for the PlayStation 3 and PlayStation Portable under Beatshapers' development. These new versions of Carnivores: Ice Age feature the same animals as before but with the inclusion of a few new weapons and creatures to hunt. But maps remain the same as the original, with only minor tweaks to enhance gameplay.

Reception 

The iOS version received "generally favorable reviews", while the PC and PSP versions received "mixed or average reviews", according to the review aggregation website Metacritic.

Slide to Play reviewed the iOS version and criticized the game's difficulty, but stated that, "For the committed mammoth hunter, Carnivores: Ice Age offers a pretty good experience."

References

External links 

2001 video games
Action Forms games
Android (operating system) games
Beatshapers games
Commercial video games with freely available source code
First-person shooters
Hunting video games
Infogrames games
IOS games
PlayStation Network games
PlayStation Portable games
Single-player video games
Video games developed in Ukraine
Video games set in the 22nd century
Video games set on fictional planets
Windows games
WizardWorks games
Yeti in fiction